Natural High (formerly Sundt Memorial Foundation) is a United States 501(c)(3) organization committed to developing and distributing a positive drug prevention message to youth nationwide. Their mission is to "inspire and empower youth to find their natural high and develop the skills and courage to live life well." Natural High was created in memorial of founder Jon Sundt's two brothers, Steven and Eric Sundt. Both used drugs as teenagers and subsequently experienced usage-related deaths.

Ambassadors 

In order to help communicate a drug-free message to youth throughout the country, Natural High partners with celebrity ambassadors who share their stories of why they choose to live naturally high and how doing so has helped them succeed and thrive in life. These ambassadors include musicians, athletes, artists, actors, and various other people of influence.

 Adam Wainright (MLB pitcher)
 Andy Powers (Master luthier)
 Anna Rawson (Professional golfer, model)
 Ash Costello (Lead vocalist of New Years Day (band))
 Beau Bokan (Lead vocalist and keyboardist of Blessthefall, founder of Golden Hearts Shine Forever clothing line)
 Bethany Hamilton (Professional surfer, author)
 Cassadee Pope (Singer songwriter, season 3 winner of The Voice)
 Charlie Carver (Actor)
 Chelsie Hightower (Professional dancer and choreographer)
 Chris Malloy (Surfer, filmmaker)
 Cody Lovaas (Singer songwriter)
 Colleen D'Agostino (Singer songwriter)
 Corbin Bleu (Actor, model, dancer, film producer & musician)
 Corinne Alexandra (Photographer)
 Danyelle Wolf (Three-time USA Boxing National Champion)
 Darrin Henson (Professional choreographer, dancer, actor, director & producer)
 Dartanyon Crockett (World champion Judo athlete, two-time Paralympic bronze medalist)
 David Ottestad (Singer songwriter)
 David Wright (MLB third baseman, captain)
 Donald Brown (Former NFL running back)
 Echosmith (Indie pop band)
 Erik Wahl (Artist, author, motivational speaker & entrepreneur)
 Jason Heyward (MLB right fielder)
 Jordan Romero (Mountain climber)
 Jordyn Wieber (Former artistic gymnast, Olympic gold medalist)
 Kyle Dake (Former collegiate wrestler, four-time NCAA Division I National Champion)
 Lauren Conrad (Fashion designer, author)
 Lee Coulter (Singer songwriter)
 Leroy Sanchez (Singer songwriter)
 Lisa Leslie (Former WNBA player, three-time WNBA MVP & four-time Olympic gold medalist)
 Mark Capicotto (Founder of Glamour Kills clothing line)
 Mike Conley, Jr. (NBA point guard)
 Mike Matheny (MLB manager)
 Mýa (Singer songwriter, actress)
 P.O.D.  (Christian nu metal band)
 Paul Rodriguez, Jr. (Professional skateboarder)
 Queen Harrison (Former hurdler & sprinter, 2010 winner of The Bowerman)
 Relient K (Christian rock band)
 Rob Machado (Professional surfer)
 Switchfoot (Alternative rock band)
 Terry Kennedy (Professional skateboarder)
 Tim Howard (MLS goalkeeper)
 Timmy Curran (Professional surfer, singer songwriter)
 Toby Morse (Lead vocalist of American band H2O)
 Tony Hawk (Professional skateboarder)
 Travis Pastrana (Professional motorsports competitor & stunt performer)

History 
1994: Jon Sundt starts Sundt Memorial Foundation (SMF) and begins speaking at school assemblies.

1995: UCSD Sundt Memorial Open, a surfing competition in memorial of Steven and Eric Sundt, raises $13,000 to support Teen Challenge, Sobriety House, and other nonprofit drug rehabilitation and mental health services.

1999: SMF hosts its first annual fundraising gala in La Jolla, California. The proceeds directly support the production and distribution of the first Natural High DVD.

2000: Fifth Annual UCSD Sundt Memorial Open and production of the first Natural High DVD. A copy is sent to all schools in the state of California free of charge.

2005: SMF produces Natural High II, the second in its DVD series. A copy is sent to all schools in the United States free of charge.

2008: SMF produces Natural High III, the third in its DVD series. A copy is sent to all schools in the United States free of charge.

2009: SMF produces Natural High IV, the fourth in its DVD series. A copy is sent to all middle schools in the United States free of charge.

2011: SMF changes its name to Natural High.

2014: Natural High celebrates its 20th anniversary.

External links 
 Natural High website

Addiction organizations in the United States
Non-profit organizations based in San Diego
Charities based in California